Frederick Francis Sears (July 7, 1913 – November 30, 1957) was an American film actor and director.

Biography

Sears, formerly based in Boston as a dramatic director and instructor, was hired as a dialogue director by Columbia Pictures in 1946. He began playing incidental roles in Columbia's productions. The actors in Columbia's stock company were expected to perform in any kind of film, from adventures to musicals, to two-reel comedy shorts, to westerns and serials. Sears gradually received larger supporting roles (as "Fred Sears"), notably in the popular Blondie series and the long-running Charles Starrett western series. By 1949 Sears was so well established in the close-knit Starrett unit that he was allowed to direct, and he continued to helm the Starrett westerns (as "Fred F. Sears") until the studio retired the series in 1952. Toward the end of the series's run, the films were being made so cheaply that the scripts would incorporate lengthy excerpts from older films. In Bonanza Town (1951), director Sears also had to appear as an actor, to match footage from his performance in West of Dodge City (1947).

Sears's budget-stretching skills attracted the attention of Columbia staff producer Sam Katzman. Katzman was a notoriously cheap producer, making topical films so quickly that they could be playing in theaters while the topic was still hot. Katzman recruited Sears for the 1952 serial Blackhawk, and after Sears was relieved of the Charles Starrett features, Katzman offered Sears full-time work in his unit. For the next five years Fred Sears worked steadily as a contract director, having no particular style or specialty of his own but capable of working in various genres. His most famous films are probably the Bill Haley musicals Rock Around the Clock and Don't Knock the Rock, and the science-fiction features Earth vs. the Flying Saucers and The Giant Claw.

Sears might have continued indefinitely with Sam Katzman but he died in late 1957, at the age of 44. His final films were released posthumously.

Filmography

Director

The Jolson Story (1946)
The Lone Hand Texan (1947)
The Corpse Came C.O.D. (1947)
Millie's Daughter (1947)
West of Dodge City (1947)
The Return of the Whistler (1948)
Tokyo Joe (1949)
Rusty's Birthday (1949)
Desert Vigilante (1949)
Horsemen of the Sierras (1949)
The Blazing Trail (1949)
Across the Badlands (1950)
Raiders of Tomahawk Creek (1950)
Lightning Guns (1950)
Prairie Roundup (1951)
Ridin' the Outlaw Trail (1951)
Snake River Desperadoes (1951)
Bonanza Town (1951)
 Pecos River (1951)
Smoky Canyon (1952)
The Hawk of Wild River (1952)
The Miraculous Blackhawk: Freedom's Champion (1952, Serial)
The Kid from Broken Gun (1952) (final film in the Charles Starrett series)
Last Train from Bombay (1952)
Target Hong Kong (1953)
Ambush at Tomahawk Gap (1953)
The 49th Man (1953)
 Flame of Calcutta (1953)
Sky Commando (1953)
Mission Over Korea (1953)
The Nebraskan (1953)
El Alaméin (1953)
Overland Pacific (1954)
Massacre Canyon (1954)
The Miami Story (1954)
The Outlaw Stallion (1954)
Wyoming Renegades (1955)
Cell 2455, Death Row (1955)
Chicago Syndicate (1955)
Apache Ambush (1955)
Teen-Age Crime Wave (1955)
Inside Detroit (1956)
Fury at Gunsight Pass (1956)
Rock Around the Clock (1956)
Earth vs. the Flying Saucers (1956)
The Werewolf (1956)
Miami Exposé (1956)
Cha-Cha-Cha Boom! (1956)
Don't Knock the Rock (1956)
Rumble on the Docks (1956)
Utah Blaine (1957)
The Giant Claw (1957)
The Night the World Exploded (1957)
Calypso Heat Wave (1957)
Escape from San Quentin (1957)
The World Was His Jury (1958)
Going Steady (1958)
Crash Landing (1958)
Badman's Country (1958)
Ghost of the China Sea (1958)

Actor

The Return of Rusty (1946) - Detective (uncredited)
The Jolson Story (1946) - Oscar - Cutter (uncredited)
Blondie Knows Best (1946) - Man on Park Bench (uncredited)
Lone Star Moonlight (1946) - Announcer (uncredited)
The Lone Hand Texan (1947) - Sam Jason (uncredited)
Millie's Daughter (1947) - Escort Manager (uncredited)
West of Dodge City (1947) - Henry Hardison (uncredited)
Blondie's Holiday (1947) - Gambler (uncredited)
Law of the Canyon (1947) - Dr. Middleton (uncredited)
For the Love of Rusty (1947) - Doc Levy (uncredited)
The Corpse Came C.O.D. (1947) - Police Detertive Dave Short
Sport of Kings (1947)
The Son of Rusty (1947) - E.A. Thompson (uncredited)
Down to Earth (1947) - Bill - Orchestra Leader (uncredited)
Blondie in the Dough (1947) - Quinn
Her Husband's Affairs (1947) - Man at Mayor's Party (uncredited)
It Had to Be You (1947) - Fireman #2 / Tilleman (uncredited)
Blondie's Anniversary (1947) - Bert Dalton
Phantom Valley (1948) - Ben Theibold (uncredited)
The Return of the Whistler (1948) - Crandall (uncredited)
Song of Idaho (1948) - Himself - Radio Announcer (uncredited)
Adventures in Silverado (1948) - Hatfield
The Fuller Brush Man (1948) - Bartender (uncredited)
Whirlwind Raiders (1948) - Tracy Beaumont
Singin' Spurs (1948) - Mr. Hanson
The Gallant Blade (1948) - Lawrence (Soldier in Woods)
Rusty Leads the Way (1948) - Jack Coleman (uncredited)
The Return of October (1948) - Reporter (uncredited)
Smoky Mountain Melody (1948) - Mr. Crump
The Man from Colorado (1949) - Veteran (uncredited)
Shockproof (1949) - Clerk (uncredited)
Slightly French (1949) - Cameraman (uncredited)
Boston Blackie's Chinese Venture (1949) - Police Chemist (uncredited)
The Crime Doctor's Diary (1949) - Ballistics Man (uncredited)
The Lone Wolf and His Lady (1949) - Tex Talbot (uncredited)
Home in San Antone (1949) - Radio Announcer Breezy
Laramie (1949) - Col. Ron Dennison
Johnny Allegro (1949) - Desk Clerk (uncredited)
The Blazing Trail (1949) - Luke Masters
The Secret of St. Ives (1949) - Narrator (voice, uncredited)
South of Death Valley (1949) - Sam Ashton
Bandits of El Dorado (1949) - Ranger Captain Richard Henley
Tokyo Joe (1949) - Medical Major (uncredited)
Rusty's Birthday (1949) - Policeman (uncredited)
Renegades of the Sage (1949) - Lt. Jones
Texas Dynamo (1950) - Hawkins
Hoedown (1950) - Sam Baker (uncredited)
David Harding, Counterspy (1950) - Peters (uncredited)
On the Isle of Samoa (1950) - Pilot (uncredited)
Convicted (1950) - Fingerprint Man (uncredited)
Counterspy Meets Scotland Yard (1950) - Agent Peters
Frontier Outpost (1950) - Major Copeland
Lightning Guns (1950) - Opening Off Screen Narrator (voice, uncredited)
Gasoline Alley (1951) - Smite (uncredited)
My True Story (1951) - E. H. Carlyle
Fort Savage Raiders (1951) - Col. Sutter
The Big Gusher (1951) - Sheriff (uncredited)
Never Trust a Gambler (1951) - State Trooper (uncredited)
Bonanza Town (1951) - Henry Hardison
Cyclone Fury (1951) - Captain Barham
Saturday's Hero (1951) - Reporter (uncredited)
The Family Secret (1951) - Laboratory Analyst (uncredited)
 The Kid from Amarillo (1951) - Jonathan Cole
Pecos River (1951) - Townsman on Porch Listening to Music (uncredited)
Laramie Mountains (1952) - Major Markham
Brave Warrior (1952) - Opening Narrator (voice, uncredited)
The Rough, Tough West (1952) - Pete Walker / Doctor (uncredited)
The Kid from Broken Gun (1952) - Opening Narrator (voice, uncredited)
Rainbow 'Round My Shoulder (1952) - Director (uncredited)
Serpent of the Nile (1953) - Off-Screen Narrator (voice, uncredited)
Flame of Calcutta (1953) - Opening Off-Screen Narrator (voice, uncredited)
The Werewolf (1956) - Narrator (voice, uncredited)
The Night the World Exploded (1957) - Narrator (voice, uncredited)
The Giant Claw (1957) - Narrator (voice, uncredited)
Crash Landing (1958) - Opening Off-Screen Narrator (voice, uncredited) (final film role)

Notes

Further reading
Dixon, Wheeler Winston. Lost in the Fifties: Recovering Phantom Hollywood. Southern Illinois University Press, 2005.

External links

1913 births
1957 deaths
American film directors
American male film actors
20th-century American male actors